Jeronimus Spengler (1589–1635) was a Swiss glass painter.

References
This article was initially translated from the German Wikipedia.

17th-century Swiss painters
Swiss male painters
1589 births
1635 deaths